EATS may refer to:
Empire Air Training Scheme
Every Aronszajn tree is special

See also
EAT (disambiguation)